Richard Bowen (born 1957) is a Welsh international lawn bowler.

Bowls career
He won a bronze medal in the fours with Jason Greenslade, Ian Slade and Dai Wilkins at the 2002 Commonwealth Games in Manchester.

He bowls for Barry Athletic Bowling Club and has previously bowled for Cardigan Bowling Club and Porthcawl Bowling Club.

He won the 1994 fours title at the Welsh National Bowls Championships when bowling for Cardigan BC and the National Senior Singles in 2018 when bowling for Barry Athletic Bowling Club. He has also won the Welsh Triples in 1988 bowling with Porthcawl Bowling Club. He is a director of BowlsWales.

References

Living people
1957 births
Commonwealth Games bronze medallists for Wales
Bowls players at the 2002 Commonwealth Games
Welsh male bowls players
Commonwealth Games medallists in lawn bowls
Medallists at the 2002 Commonwealth Games